French verbs are a part of speech in French grammar. Each verb lexeme has a collection of finite and non-finite forms in its conjugation scheme.

Finite forms depend on grammatical tense and person/number. There are eight simple tense–aspect–mood forms, categorized into the indicative, subjunctive and imperative moods, with the conditional mood sometimes viewed as an additional category. The eight simple forms can also be categorized into four tenses (future, present, past, and future-of-the-past), or into two aspects (perfective and imperfective).

The three non-finite moods are the infinitive, past participle, and present participle.

There are compound constructions that use more than one verb. There is also a construction which is used to distinguish passive voice from active voice.

Conjugation 

French verbs are conjugated by isolating the stem of the verb and adding an ending. In the first and second conjugation, the stem is easily identifiable from the infinitive, and remains essentially constant throughout the paradigm. In the third group, the relationship between the infinitive form and the stem is less consistent, and several distinct stems are needed to produce all the forms in the paradigm. For example, the verb  ("drink") has the stems boi-, boiv-, bu-, and buv-.

The ending depends on the mood, tense, aspect, and voice of the verb, as well as on the person and number of its subject. Every conjugation exhibits some degree of syncretism, where the same (homophonous, and possibly also homographic) form is used to realize distinct combinations of grammatical features. This is most noticeable for -er verbs. For instance, the conjugated form parle can be the 1st or 3rd person singular indicative or subjunctive form of parler, or the singular familiar imperative. Furthermore, the 2nd person singular indicative and subjunctive form parles and the 3rd person plural form parlent are pronounced the same way as parle (except in liaison contexts). The prevalence of syncretism in conjugation paradigms is one functional explanation for the fact that French does not allow null subjects, unlike most of the other Romance languages.

Classification
The second conjugation class consists of all verbs with infinitives in -ir or -ïr and present participles in -issant or -ïssant, as well as the verb . There are somewhat over 300 such verbs, all conjugated identically, with some minor exceptions.  The -iss- or -ïss- in much of their conjugation is a reflex of the Latin inchoative infix -isc-/-esc-, but does not retain any aspectual semantics.
The third conjugation class consists of all other verbs: aller, arguably (r)envoyer, a number of verbs in -ir (including all verbs in -oir, which is an etymologically unrelated ending), and all verbs in -re. Nonetheless, this class is very small compared to the other two, though it does contain some of the most common verbs. There are about 370 verbs in this group, though a much smaller number are still in frequent use.

Moods
As with English verbs, French verbs have both non-finite moods (les modes impersonnels), also called verbals, and finite ones (les modes personnels).

Finite moods

The finite moods are the indicative (l'indicatif), the imperative (l'impératif), and the subjunctive (le subjonctif). As discussed below, sometimes the conditional is recognized as a fourth mood. While the rules that determine the correct mood are quite complex, they are simplified and summarized in the following table:

Many linguists recognize a fourth mood, the conditional (le conditionnel), which is used in almost exactly the same circumstances as the conditional in English. In French, « Je le ferais si j'avais assez de temps » is "I would do it if I had enough time" in English. The conditional can also be used evidentially, to express reservations about the verb: « Il serait suivi par un psychologue », "He is apparently/is said to be/[etc.] under the care of a psychologist." Other linguists consider the conditional to be a tense of the indicative mood. The two camps do not disagree on the rules for when and how to use the conditional. A third camp recognizes both "conditionnel présent/conditionnel passé" (for use in conditional sentences), and "indicatif futur du passé / indicatif futur antérieur du passé" (for tense concords, "future from a past point of view"; e.g. « Il m'a dit qu'il le ferait le lendemain », "He told me he would do it the next day"), but they recognize also that both are conjugated the same.

Non-finite moods

The infinitive has a present tense, with a perfect: "faire" means "to do", while "avoir fait" means "to have done".
There is a present participle, with a perfect construction: "faisant" means "doing", while "ayant fait" means "having done". As noted above, this participle is not used in forming a continuous aspect. Further, it cannot be used as a noun, in the way that present participles in English have the same form as gerunds; the only verbal noun is the infinitive.
There is a gérondif ("gerundive", but different from the Latin gerundive), formed with the clitic en and the present participle: "en faisant" means "by doing" or "while doing". (It is analogous to the English "in doing", but in English, since "doing" can act as a noun, "in doing" is taken as a prepositional phrase rather than as a separate verb form. That interpretation is not available for "en faisant".) Similarly, "en ayant fait" means "by having done".
There is a separate past participle: "fait" means "done". As in English, it can be used in the passive voice, in the perfect form, or on its own as an adjective. The past participle has no perfect, except arguably in the special surcomposé tense.

Tenses and aspects

Tenses and aspects of the indicative mood

The indicative mood has five "simple" (synthetic) tense-aspect forms, conveying four tenses (times of action) (future, present, past, and future-of-past) and two aspects (fabrics of time) (perfective, conveying an action viewed in its entirety without its time frame being considered in more detail, and imperfective, conveying an action that occurs repeatedly or continuously). The tense-aspect forms of the indicative mood in French are called the present (le présent: present tense, imperfective aspect), the simple past (le passé simple: past tense, perfective aspect), the imperfect (l'imparfait: past tense, imperfective aspect), the future (le futur: future tense, unspecified aspect), and the conditional (le conditionnel: future-in-past tense, unspecified aspect). Note that, as discussed above, in some uses the conditional can be considered a separate mood completely, while in other uses it is the future-in-past tense of the indicative. The use of the various tense forms is described in the following table:

Additionally, the indicative has five compound (two-word) tense-aspect forms, each of which is formed analogously to the perfect in languages such as English (e.g., "have done") (though in French this form does not indicate the perfect aspect) as applied to one of the above simple tense forms. These tense forms are used to indicate events before the corresponding simple tense forms; for example, « À ce moment-là, il se souvint de ce qu'il avait promis » ("At that moment, he remembered what he had promised"). In addition, except in literature or very formal speeches, the present perfect form is used in modern French wherever the simple past would have been used in older or more literary writing. Since this use is much more common than its use as a true present perfect, it is usually called the compound past (le passé composé). Further, where older or more literary French would have used the perfect form of the simple past tense (le passé antérieur) for the past-of-the-past, modern non-literary French uses the pluperfect (le plus-que-parfait; the perfect of the imperfect), or sometimes a new form called the surcomposé (literally, "over-compound"), which re-applies the perfect to the compound past, resulting in a structure like « Je lai eu fait » (literally, "I it have had done").

Unlike English or Spanish, French does not mark for a continuous aspect. Thus, "I am doing it" (continuous) and "I do it" both translate to the same sentence in French: « Je le fais. » However, the distinction is often clear from context; and when not, it can be conveyed using periphrasis; for example, the expression être en train de [faire quelque chose] ("to be in the middle of [doing something]") is often used to convey the sense of a continuous aspect. (For example, "I am doing it" might be expressed as « Je suis en train de le faire », "I am in the middle of doing it.") In the case of the past tense, neither the simple nor the compound past tense is ever used with a continuous sense; therefore, the imperfect often indicates a continuous sense (though it does have other uses, as discussed above).

Similarly to English, the verb  (to go) can be used as an auxiliary verb to create a near-future tense (le futur proche). Whereas English uses the continuous aspect (to be going), French uses the simple present tense; for example, the English sentence "I am going to do it tomorrow" would in French be « Je vais le faire demain ». As in English, this form can generally be replaced by the present or future tense: "I am doing it tomorrow", "I shall do it tomorrow", « Je le fais demain », « Je le ferai demain ».

As in the near-future tense, the auxiliary verb is in the present tense. Unlike ,  needs the preposition de before the infinitive. Hence the English sentence "I [just] did it a minute ago" would in French be « Je viens de le faire il y a une minute ».

Tenses and aspects of the subjunctive mood

Forms

The subjunctive mood has only two simple tense-aspect forms: a present (le présent du subjonctif) and an imperfect (l'imparfait du subjonctif). Of these, only the present is used nowadays; like the simple past indicative, the imperfect subjunctive is only found in older and more literary works. When both tense-aspect forms are used, there is no difference in meaning between the two; the present is used in subordinate clauses whose main clauses are in a present or future tense, as well as in the few main clauses that use the subjunctive, and the imperfect is used in subordinate clauses whose main clauses are in a past tense form (other than present perfect). Except in literature and very formal speeches, modern French uses the present subjunctive even where an older or more literary work would use the imperfect subjunctive.

As with the indicative, the subjunctive also has one compound tense form for each simple tense form. The difference between the present perfect subjunctive (le passé du subjonctif) and the pluperfect subjunctive (le plus-que-parfait du subjonctif) is analogous to the difference between the present subjunctive and imperfect subjunctive; of the two, only the present perfect subjunctive is found in modern French.

Uses
The subjunctive in French is used almost wherever it would be in English, and in many other situations as well. It is used in que ("that") clauses to indicate emotion, doubt, possibility, necessity, desire, and so forth. For example, as in English one says

Je préfère qu'il le fasse, "I prefer that he it do", "I prefer that he do it"

But also, unlike in English, the subjunctive is used in, for example,

Je veux qu'il le fasse "I want that he it do", "I want him to do it"
Je crains qu'il (ne) parte "I fear that he (optional subjunctive particle) leave", "I am afraid that he will leave"
Je cherche un homme qui sache la vérité "I seek a man who knows the truth", "I am looking for a man who knows the truth"

Sometimes the subjunctive is used in the interrogative and the negative but not in the affirmative:

Penses-tu qu'il soit sympa ? (subjunctive) "Do you think that he is nice?"
Oui, je pense qu'il est sympa. (indicative) "Yes, I think that he is nice."
Non, je ne pense pas qu'il soit sympa. (subjunctive) "No, I do not think that he is nice."

In addition to situations of doubt, negatives stated with certainty take the subjunctive:

Il n'y a rien que nous puissions faire. "There is nothing that we can do."

Superlatives also can optionally be accompanied by the subjunctive in a que clause, if the speaker feels doubt:

C'est le meilleur livre que j'aie pu trouver. "That is the best book that I could find."

Finally, as in English, counterfactual conditions in the past are expressed by backshifting the apparent time reference. In English this backshifted form is called the pluperfect subjunctive, and unless it is expressed in inverted form it is identical in form to the pluperfect indicative; it is called subjunctive because of the change in implied time of action. In French, however, there is a distinction in form between the seldom used pluperfect subjunctive and the pluperfect indicative, which is used in this situation. For example,

Si on l'avait su (pluperfect indicative), on aurait pu (conditional perfect) l'empêcher. "Had we known (pluperfect subjunctive) it, we would have been able (conditional perfect) to prevent it.

Tenses and aspects of the imperative mood

The imperative only has a present tense, with a rarely used perfect: "fais-le" and "aie-le fait" both mean "do it", with the latter implying a certain deadline (somewhat like English "have it done").

Voice
Like English, French has two voices, the unmarked active voice and the marked passive voice. As in English, the passive voice is formed by using the appropriate form of "to be" (être) and the past participle of the main verb.

Temporal auxiliary verbs

In French, all compound tense-aspect forms are formed with an auxiliary verb (either  "to be" or  "to have"). Most verbs use avoir as their auxiliary verb. The exceptions are all reflexive verbs and a number of verbs of motion or change of state, including some of the most frequently used intransitive verbs of the language:

  — to go
  — to arrive
  — to pass away
 1 — to descend
  — to become
 1 — to enter
 1 — to climb/mount
  — to die
  — to be born
  — to leave or part
 1 — to pass by
  — to stay
 1 — to return
revenir - to return/ to come back
 1 — to go out
 1 — to fall
  — to come
These verbs are often remembered by the acronym MRS VANDER TRAMP or DR & MRS VANDER TRAMP. In the former acronym, devenir and revenir aren't mentioned because they are often thought of as variations of venir.

Verbs that are derived from these by prefixation may continue to select être, but this is not always the case. For example:
(with être)
prefix re-: , 1, 1, 1, etc.
(with avoir)

(The verbs marked with "1" above combine with être in their intransitive uses, and avoir when used transitively.)

A small number of verbs, including some already mentioned above, can in fact be found with either auxiliary. There may be a subtle change of meaning depending on the auxiliary chosen, and one auxiliary is usually more literary or archaic than the other.

The distinction between the two auxiliary verbs is important for the correct formation of the compound tense-aspect forms and is essential to the agreement of the past participle.

Past participle agreement
The past participle is used in three ways in French: as an adjective, in the passive construction, and in the compound tense-aspect constructions. When it is used as an adjective, it follows all the regular adjective agreement rules. In passive constructions, it always agrees with the passive subject.

In compound tense-aspect forms, more complicated agreement rules apply, reflecting the subtle priority rules between the attribute meaning (which implies an agreement) and the compound tense construction (which by itself does not imply any agreement).

A. The auxiliary verb is avoir.

B. The auxiliary is être, and the verb is not reflexive. The past participle agrees with the subject: 
Elles sont arrivées. ("They (fem.) arrived.")
C. The auxiliary is être and the verb is reflexive. The agreement rules are in fact the same as those for structures with avoir in A, keeping in mind that the reflexive pronoun corresponds to either the direct object or the indirect object of the verb.

See also 
 Romance verbs – shows the development of French verbs from Latin
 English verbs

References

External links

Verbe Du Jour - French/English verb conjugation with translations, audio and examples
Verb2Verbe - French/English verb conjugation with translations
Verb Conjugation Trainer by Très Bien French
French conjugation & grammar of verbs
Le Conjugueur - online conjugation for all French verbs
Bescherelle - Reference book for French Conjugation
Comment-conjuguer.fr - online conjugation for all French verbs and conjugation rules

Verbs
Indo-European verbs